John Connor (born 14 February 1944) is a former Irish Fine Gael politician. He was first elected to Dáil Éireann at the 1981 general election as a Fine Gael Teachta Dála (TD) for the Roscommon constituency.

He lost his seat at the February 1982 general election, but subsequently was nominated by the Taoiseach Garret FitzGerald to the 17th Seanad. He was elected to the Agricultural Panel of the 18th Seanad in 1987. At the 1989 general election he re-gained his Dáil seat for the Roscommon constituency and was re-elected for the new Longford–Roscommon constituency at the 1992 general election. He again lost his Dáil seat at the 1997 general election but was again elected to the Agricultural Panel of the 21st Seanad. At the 2002 general election he failed to get elected to the Dáil and he also lost his Seanad seat.

In 1999, he was elected to Roscommon County Council, and was re-elected at the 2004 local elections. He did not contest the 2009 local elections.

References

1944 births
Living people
Fine Gael TDs
Members of the 22nd Dáil
Members of the 26th Dáil
Members of the 27th Dáil
Members of the 17th Seanad
Members of the 18th Seanad
Members of the 21st Seanad
Local councillors in County Roscommon
Irish farmers
Nominated members of Seanad Éireann
Fine Gael senators